Hendi Bolagh (also Romanized as Hendī Bolāgh; also known as Hendī Būlakh and Hindibulan) is a village in Yeylan-e Jonubi Rural District, Bolbanabad District, Dehgolan County, Kurdistan Province, Iran. At the 2006 census, its population was 38, in 7 families. The village is populated by Kurds.

References 

Towns and villages in Dehgolan County
Kurdish settlements in Kurdistan Province